CERN directors general typically serve 5 year terms beginning on January 1.

List

CERN